Per Aage Brandt (26 April 1944 – 11 November 2021) was a Danish writer, poet, linguist and musician, born in Buenos Aires. He got his Master of Arts in Romance Philology from the University of Copenhagen (1971) & held a Doctorate of Semiotics from the Sorbonne University (1987).

Brandt published a large number of books on the subjects of semiotics, linguistics, culture, and music as well as poetry.

He made his debut as a poet in 1969 with the poetry collection Poesi and has since then written several poetry collections and essays. He has translated Molière and Marquis de Sade, amongst others, and in 2000 he translated (or "re-wrote" in Danish) the poetry collection Cantabile by Henrik, the prince consort of Denmark. Some of his translations were subsequently set to music in Frederik Magle's symphonic suite Cantabile.

Bibliography
 La Charpente modale du sens, John Benjamins, Amsterdam 1992.
 Dynamiques du sens, Aarhus University Press 1994.
 Morphologies of Meaning, Aarhus University Press 1995.
 Det menneskeligt virkelige, Politisk Revys Forlag, Copenhagen 2002
 Spaces, Domains, and Meaning, Peter Lang, Bern 2004

References

Kraks Blå Bog (2008/09), 1279 pages, 
 https://www.storyvillerecords.com/products/cry-1018443

External links
 
 

1944 births
2021 deaths
University of Copenhagen alumni
University of Paris alumni
Danish male poets
Linguists from Denmark
Danish semioticians
20th-century Danish poets
20th-century Danish translators
20th-century Danish male writers
Danish expatriates in Argentina
Danish expatriates in France
People from Buenos Aires